William Allan Stewart (22 October 1889 – 29 April 1958) was an Australian sprinter. He competed in the men's 100 metres at the 1912 Summer Olympics.

References

1889 births
1958 deaths
Athletes (track and field) at the 1912 Summer Olympics
Australian male sprinters
Olympic athletes of Australasia
Place of birth missing